The term Malabar rainforests refers to one or more distinct ecoregions recognized by biogeographers: 
 the Malabar Coast moist forests formerly occupied the coastal zone to the 250 metre elevation (but 95% of these forests no longer exist)
 the South Western Ghats moist deciduous forests grow at intermediate elevations
 the South Western Ghats montane rain forests cover the areas above 1000 metres elevation

The Monsooned Malabar blend of coffee bean comes from the area.

Malabar Coast moist forests

The Malabar Coast moist forests is a tropical moist broadleaf forest ecoregion of southwestern India. It lies along India's Konkan and Malabar coasts, in a narrow strip between the Arabian Sea and the Western Ghats range, which runs parallel to the coast.

The ecoregion extends from sea level to the 250 metre contour of the Western Ghats. It is bounded on the east by the North Western Ghats moist deciduous forests in Maharashtra and Karnataka, and the South Western Ghats moist deciduous forests in Kerala.

Very little of the natural vegetation of the ecoregion remains; it has largely been cleared for agriculture, grazing, and teak plantations.

South Western Ghats moist deciduous forests

The South Western Ghats moist deciduous forests is a tropical moist broadleaf forest ecoregion of southern India. It covers the southern portion of the Western Ghats range and the Nilgiri Hills between 250 and 1000 metres elevation in Kerala, Karnataka and Tamil Nadu states.

Geography 
It includes the southern ranges of the Western Ghats, including the Agastyamalai and Anamalai, and the eastward spurs of the Nilgiri Hills and Palni Hills. The forests of Wayanad in northern Kerala mark the transition to the North Western Ghats moist deciduous forests to the north. To the west, the Malabar Coast moist forests ecoregion lies in the coastal strip between the 250 meter contour and the Malabar Coast. To the east, the ecoregion transitions to the South Deccan Plateau dry deciduous forests ecoregion in the drier rain shadow of the Western Ghats. It surrounds the South Western Ghats montane rain forests ecoregion, which lies above 1000 metres elevation.

South Western Ghats montane rain forests

The South Western Ghats montane rain forests are an ecoregion of southern India, covering the southern portion of the Western Ghats range in Karnataka Kerala and Tamil Nadu, at elevations over 1000 meters. They are cooler and wetter than the lower-elevation South Western Ghats moist deciduous forests, which surround the montane rain forests.

Geography 
It is estimated that two-thirds of the original forests have been cleared, and only 3,200 square kilometres, or 13% of the intact area, is protected.

The southern portion of the Western Ghats contains the highest peaks in the range, notably Anai Mudi in Kerala, at 2695 meters elevation. The Ghats intercept the moisture-laden monsoon winds off the Arabian Sea, and the average annual precipitation exceeds 2,800 mm. The northeast monsoon from October to November supplements the June to September southwest monsoon. The South Western Ghats are the wettest portion of peninsular India, and are surrounded by drier ecoregions to the east and north.

Flora 
The ecoregion is the most species-rich in peninsular India, and is home to numerous endemic species. The cool and moist climate, high rainfall, and variety of microclimates brought about by differences in elevation and exposure supports lush and diverse forests; 35% of the plant species are endemic to the ecoregion. Moist evergreen montane forests are the predominant habitat type. The montane evergreen forests support a great diversity of species. The trees generally form a canopy at 15 to 20 m, and the forests are multistoried and rich in epiphytes, especially orchids. Characteristic canopy trees are Cullenia exarillata, Mesua ferrea, Palaquium ellipticum, Gluta travancorica, and Nageia wallichiana. Nageia is a podocarp conifer with origins in the ancient supercontinent of Gondwana, of which India was formerly part, and a number of other plants in the ecoregion have Gondwana origins. Other evergreen tree species of the montane forest include Calophyllum austroindicum, Garcinia rubro-echinata, Garcinia travancorica, Diospyros barberi, Memecylon subramanii, Memecylon gracile, Goniothalamus rhyncantherus, and Vernonia travancorica.

The other major habitat type in the ecoregion is the shola-grassland complex, found at elevations of 1,900 to 2,220 m. Shola is a stunted forest, with an upper story of small trees, generally Pygeum gardneri, Schefflera racemosa, Linociera ramiflora, Syzygium spp., Rhododendron nilgiricum, Mahonia nepalensis, Elaeocarpus recurvatus, Ilex denticulata, Michelia nilagirica, Actinodaphne bourdellonii, and Litsea wightiana. Below the upper story is a low understory and a dense shrub layer. These shola forests are interspersed with montane grasslands, characterized by frost- and fire-resistant grass species like Chrysopogon zeylanicus, Cymbopogon flexuosus, Arundinella ciliata, Arundinella mesophylla, Arundinella tuberculata, Themeda tremula, and Sehima nervosum.

Fauna 
The ecoregion also supports a rich fauna, which is also high in endemism: of 78 mammal species, 10 are endemic, along with 42% of the fishes, 48% of the reptiles, and 75% of the amphibians. Of 309 bird species, 13 are endemic.

The ecoregion supports India's largest elephant population, along with populations of threatened tiger (Panthera tigris), leopard (Panthera pardus), sloth bear (Melursus ursinus), gaur (Bos gaurus), and wild dog (Cuon alpinus). The rare and endemic Nilgiri tahr (Hemitragus hylocrius) is limited to a 400 km band of shola-grassland mosaic, from the Nilgiri Hills in the north to the Ashambu Hills in the south. The lion-tailed macaque (Macaca silenus) and Nilgiri macaque (Semnopithecus johnii) are endangered endemic primate species.

90 of India's 484 reptile species are endemic to the ecoregion, with eight endemic genera (Brachyophidium, Dravidogecko, Melanophidium, Plectrurus, Ristella, Salea, Teretrurus, and Xylophis). Almost 50% of India's 206 amphibian species are endemic to the ecoregion, with six endemic genera (Indotyphlus, Melanobatrachus, Nannobatrachus, Nyctibatrachus, Ranixalus, and Uraeotyphlus).

Protected areas 
As of 1997, 13 protected areas had been designated, covering an area of over 3,200 km².

 Pushpagiri (60 km²)
 Talakaveri (250 km²)
 Brahmagiri (190 km²)
 Aralam (50 km²)
 Karimpuzha (230 km²)
 Mukurthi National Park, Tamil Nadu (60 km²)
 Silent Valley National Park, Kerala (110 km²)
 Meghamalai (120 km²)
 Periyar National Park, Kerala (540 km²)
 Anamalai (600 km²)
 Eravikulam National Park, Kerala (97 km²)
 Parambikulam (260 km²)
 Idukki (80 km²)
 Shenduruny (300 km²)
 Kalakad-Mundanthurai (290 km²)
 Peppara (40 km²)

See also
 Malabar (Northern Kerala)
 North Malabar

Ecoregions of India